Chaim Sheba Medical Center at Tel HaShomer, also Tel HaShomer Hospital, is the largest hospital in Israel, located in the Tel Aviv District city of Ramat Gan at Tel HaShomer neighborhood, Israel. In 2020, Newsweek ranked it as the 9th-best hospital in the world. In 2021, it was ranked as the 10th best hospital in the world, scoring the highest for an Israeli hospital.

History

The hospital was established in 1948 as Israel's first military hospital, to treat Israeli casualties of 1948 Arab-Israeli War. It was founded in a cluster of abandoned military barracks from the Mandate era, and was originally known as Army Hospital No. 5. Israeli Prime Minister David Ben-Gurion had it renamed Tel HaShomer Hospital.

In 1953, it became a civilian hospital, and Dr. Chaim Sheba became its director. Following Sheba's death, the hospital was renamed in his honor.Mordechai Shani served as Director General for thirty-three years.

Situated on an  campus in east Ramat Gan, Sheba operates 120 departments and clinics. It has 1,430 beds, about 1,250 physicians, 2,300 nurses and 1,500 other healthcare workers. Sheba also employs 1,700 other staff, and nearly 1,000 long-term volunteers, researchers and foreign interns.

It handles over 1,000,000.5 patient visits a year, including 200,000 emergency visits annually, and conducts more than two million medical tests of all types each year, on a $320 million (approximate) annual budget. Sheba is supported by donations from a network of philanthropists and friends from around the world.

Sheba includes an acute care hospital, a rehabilitation hospital (one of the largest rehabilitation hospitals in the world, with 800 beds and 14 buildings), a women's hospital, a children's hospital, an eating disorder clinic, a PTSD clinic for soldiers, a laboratory division, an outpatient division, and an academic campus.

Sheba is home to the Israel National Center for Health Policy and Epidemiology Research (equivalent to the U.S. National Institutes of Health), the internationally acclaimed Israel National Center for Medical Simulation (MSR), the Israel National Blood Bank and Cord Blood Bank, and the Safra International Congenital Heart Center. Other major centers at Sheba include the Sheba Cancer Treatment and Research Centers, the Sheba Heart Center that was donated by Lev Leviev, and the Tel Hashomer Medical Research, Infrastructure and Services Co. Ltd., which provides global consulting and training services  There is also a rehabilitation hotel, the Shilev Hotel, for recuperating patients. It has 36 double rooms and a medical wing with a doctors office, nurses room, and treatment room.

Sheba provides services to patients from across the Middle East, including many patients (especially children) from the Palestinian Authority. It also provides guidance and mentoring in the planning, construction and operation of healthcare systems and hospitals around the world. Sheba has helped to found a multi-disciplinary clinic in Ukraine, an imaging Center in Uzbekistan, a medical center in the Republic of Equatorial Guinea, an oncology center in Mauritania, a polyclinic in the Ivory Coast, and more. Sheba has sent medical support to Kosovo, Armenia, Cambodia, Sri Lanka, and Rwanda. Many patients from the Palestinian Authority and the Arab world are treated at Sheba. After a massive explosion in Equatorial Guinea, a relief mission was sent by Sheba Medical Center. Eight Kurdish infants in need of emergency cardiac surgery were operated on in Israel by Sheba's pediatric cardiac-thoracic surgeons. In December 2020, Sheba's Israel Center for Disaster Medicine and Humanitarian Response team dispatched a coronavirus medical team to the Piedmont region of Northern Italy. Sheba sent a large shipment of equipment to Uruguay along with experts in logistics, treatment and pandemic mitigation.

In 2021, the United Arab Emirates (UAE) announced the signing of a Memorandum of Understanding (MoU) with Sheba Medical Center. According to a statement released by the Emirates News Agency, the MoU aims to “create a framework for cooperation in developing and improving healthcare services to meet the needs of a healthier community.”

Clinical research

A large proportion of clinical research in Israel is conducted at Sheba. It is the main clinical trial venue for human health scientific studies conducted by the Weizmann Institute of Science, Tel Aviv University and Bar-Ilan University. In 2011, Sheba topped the list of Israeli hospitals for revenue acquired through research, at NIS 42.4 million, but came second in 2012.

Scientific research at Sheba includes a study of pregnancy after transplantation of cryopreserved ovarian tissue in a patient with ovarian failure after chemotherapy; a study of alginate-based stem cell biomaterial injected into heart attack victims that may repair heart tissue; and a study showing that heavy cell phone users are subject to a higher risks of benign and malignant tumors of the salivary gland. The Israeli company Ventor Technologies developed a novel type of heart valve which can be implanted by catheterization rather than open-heart surgery at Sheba. This invention was sold to medical device maker Medtronic in 2009 for US$325 million, of which about 10% went to Sheba Medical Center.

In October 2020, the hospital piloted a rapid coronavirus test that detects protein portions of the virus and yields results within two to 15 minutes.

Foreign internships 
In 2011, the hospital signed agreements with St. George's University in London and with the University of Nicosia (Cyprus) to train medical students for a fee of 25,000 euros per student and to award them MBBS degrees. Deans of several Israeli medical schools, including Yosef Mekori of the Sackler Faculty of Medicine at Tel Aviv University, and Rivka Carmi, president of the Ben-Gurion University, criticised the programme, claiming it would hurt the quality of medical education received by Israeli students and harm medical care in Israel.

Medical tourism
In a 2018 report on medical tourism, the Israeli Finance Ministry reported that Sheba earned 129 million shekels from medical tourists in the previous year.

Awards and recognition

In 2020, Newsweek ranked Sheba Medical Center as the 9th-best hospital in the world. In 2021, it was ranked as the 10th best hospital in the world, scoring the highest for an Israeli hospital.

Notable staff
 Moshe Many
 Jacob Sadé
 Eli Schwartz
 Limor Schreibman-Sharir

Notable patients
Isaias Afwerki, President of Eritrea
Ariel Sharon, Prime Minister of Israel

Controversy
On 12 June 2008 at 11 a.m., Sheba Medical Centre discharged Omar Abu Jariban, despite still needing medical attention and being in a confused state, and handed him over to the police. Two days later, he was found dead by the side of Route 443, barefoot, still wearing a hospital gown, a catheter and a diaper. Abu Jariban, a Palestinian from Gaza, had allegedly stolen a car and was seriously injured in an accident on 28 May 2008. He was treated at Sheba Medical Centre, but discharged in very poor condition to the police. They first took him to Rehovot police station, but then dumped him by the side of a highway, barefoot and without food or water. He died from dehydration. After his body was identified, the police and hospital staff blamed each other for his death. In 2012, two Israeli police officers involved were convicted of negligent homicide and were sentenced to two and a half years in prison. Damages were paid to the family of the victim in the name of the police and the hospital.

In 2014, during the attack of the Israeli Army on the Gaza Strip (2014 Israel–Gaza conflict), a Palestinian nurse of the clinic posted on Facebook that “the Israel Defense Forces are war criminals, only killing innocent people, and the state is claiming [it is done] 'by mistake and we are investigating the incident.'” Hospital director Zeev Rotstein suspended the nurse for two weeks, writing that the nurse's statement constituted a “disciplinary offense”. In accordance with a labour court rule, the hospital revoked the suspension, while the nurse dropped the request for an injunction against the suspension and apologized in writing to the hospital management for the post on his Facebook page.

In 2020, Mustafa Younis, an Israeli Arab, came to the clinic for a psychiatric examination. Inside the hospital, he threatened two people with a knife, but hurt nobody. Hospital security guards followed him and forcibly removed him from his car as he was about to leave. Younis stabbed one guard in the head, injuring him lightly. The guards disarmed and incapacitated him on the ground, then proceeded to shoot him five or six times and killed him. Only after several protests, the police opened an investigation into the killing.

See also
 List of hospitals in Israel
 Health care in Israel

References

External links
 Sheba Medical Center

Hospitals in Israel
Buildings and structures in Ramat Gan
Hospitals established in 1948